The 2016–17 season was Al-Ettifaq Football Club's 72nd season in existence and first season in the Pro League since their relegation in the 2013–14 season; after gaining promotion last year. Along with the Pro League, the club also competed in the Crown Prince Cup and the King Cup. The season covered the period from 1 July 2016 to 30 June 2017.

Players

Squad information

Transfers

In

Summer

Winter

Out

Summer

Winter

Loan in

Summer

Loan out

Summer

Winter

Pre-season friendlies

Competitions

Overall

Last Updated: 4 May 2017

Pro League

League table

Results summary

Results by round

Matches
All times are local, AST (UTC+3).

Crown Prince Cup

All times are local, AST (UTC+3).

King Cup

Statistics

Squad statistics
As of 3 May 2017.

|}

Goalscorers

Last Updated: 29 April 2017

Clean sheets

Last Updated: 28 February 2017

References

Ettifaq FC seasons
Ettifaq